John Armitage (1910–1980) was the British Editor of Encyclopædia Britannica.

Biography
Born on 25 September 1910, John Armitage was educated at Bedford School and at Emmanuel College, Cambridge. He was Assistant Editor and then Editor of The Fortnightly Review, between 1937 and 1954. During the Second World War he served in the Royal Air Force and was promoted to the rank of Squadron Leader. He was on the editorial staff of the Times Educational Supplement, between 1946 and 1949, and was British Editor of Encyclopædia Britannica, between 1949 and 1967.

John Armitage was Chairman of the Liberal Party's Education Advisory Committee between 1948 and 1956. He died on 1 February 1980, aged 69.

Publications
A History of Ball Games and Rugby Fives, Lonsdale Library, 1934
To Christian England, 1942
Europe in Bondage, 1943
Partnership in Education, 1948
Encyclopædia Britannica, 14th and 15th editions, 1949-1967
Britannica Book of the Year, 1950-1965
The Unservile State, 1957
Children's Britannica, 1960
Our Children’s Education, 1960
The Oxford Companion to Sports and Games, 1975
Man at Play, 1977

References

1910 births
1980 deaths
People educated at Bedford School
Alumni of Emmanuel College, Cambridge
English book editors
British writers
Royal Air Force pilots of World War II
English male non-fiction writers
20th-century English male writers